Yang Kyong-Il ( or  ; born 7 August 1989 in Pyongyang) is a male freestyle wrestler from North Korea who is a double world champion and won a bronze medal at the 2012 Summer Olympics.

Career 
Yang won his first world title at the 2009 World Championships.  He beat Bayaraagiin Naranbaatar, Krasimir Krastanov, Mykola Aivazian and Rizvan Gadzhiev before beating Sezar Akgül in the final.

He participated in Men's freestyle 55 kg at 2008 Summer Olympics. He lost in the last 16 to Namig Sevdimov and was eliminated from the competition.

At the 2012 Summer Olympics, Yang beat Dilshod Mansurov before losing to Dzhamal Otarsultanov.  Because Otarsultanov reached the final, Yang was entered into the repechage.  In the repechage, Yang beat Sem Shilimela before beating Daulet Niyazbekov to win a bronze medal.

In 2014, Yang won his second world title in Tashkent.  He beat Kim Sung-gwon, Yuki Takahashi and Hassan Rahimi before beatingVladimer Khinchegashvili in the final.

At the 2016 Olympics, Yang lost to Rei Higuchi in the first round.  Because Higuchi reached the final, Yang was entered into the repechage.  In the repechage, Yang beat Asadulla Lachinau before losing to Yowlys Bonne to leave without a medal.

References

External links
 Wrestler bio on beijing2008.com
 

Living people
1989 births
Olympic wrestlers of North Korea
North Korean male sport wrestlers
Wrestlers at the 2008 Summer Olympics
Wrestlers at the 2012 Summer Olympics
Wrestlers at the 2016 Summer Olympics
Asian Games medalists in wrestling
Olympic bronze medalists for North Korea
Olympic medalists in wrestling
Wrestlers at the 2010 Asian Games
Medalists at the 2012 Summer Olympics
World Wrestling Champions
Asian Games silver medalists for North Korea
Medalists at the 2010 Asian Games
Asian Wrestling Championships medalists
21st-century North Korean people